Abdul Mohsen Al-Bagir (born 24 February 1976) is a Saudi Arabian male weightlifter, competing in the 69 kg category and representing Saudi Arabia at international competitions. He participated at the 2004 Summer Olympics in the 69 kg event. He competed at world championships, most recently at the 2003 World Weightlifting Championships.

Major results

References

External links
 
 
 

1976 births
Living people
Saudi Arabian male weightlifters
Olympic weightlifters of Saudi Arabia
Weightlifters at the 2004 Summer Olympics
Place of birth missing (living people)